Bennett Roberts (1 July 1950 – 7 June 2021) was a Welsh actor most famous for his portrayal of Chief Inspector Derek Conway in the ITV British television series The Bill.

Early life 
Roberts was born in Bangor, Gwynedd on 1 July 1950. He attended Friars School and went on to study at the Webber Douglas Academy of Dramatic Art in London, graduating in 1978.

Career 
He was best known for playing Chief Inspector Derek Conway in The Bill between 1987 and 2002.

Other numerous television appearances include The Professionals, Angels, The Queen's Nose, Doctors and Casualty.

He had also been active in films. In 2010, he appeared in the Mike Leigh film, Another Year. In 2011, he played Briggs in Cary Fukunaga's Jane Eyre. In 2014, he played Jean in A Little Chaos directed by Alan Rickman, and then in 2016 appearing in Miss Peregrine's Home for Peculiar Children, directed by Tim Burton. In 2019, he appeared as William, in the Danish biographical film Daniel.

Personal life 
Roberts lived in Ilkeston, Derbyshire, with his wife, Helen Lloyd, a former television producer and continuity announcer for Central TV. Roberts had one son and one granddaughter.

Roberts died on 7 June 2021, at the age of 70 due to Kidney Failure.

Filmography

Television 

A Woman's Place? (1978) – Mark
The Professionals (1980) – CI5 Man
Angels (1980) – Graham
Doctor Who (1984) – Trooper
The Bretts (1987) – Milkman
Hard Cases (1988) – Tom Gregory
The Bill (1988–2002) – Chief Inspector Derek Conway
Tales of Sherwood Forest (1989) – Malcolm
The Bill: Target (1996) – Acting Supt. Conway
Sooty Heights (2000) – Policeman
The Queen's Nose (2001) – Sir Cedric Barkhouse
Casualty (2005) – Mike Meller
Fallet - Skandia (TV Movie) (2009) – Will Mesdag
Doctors (2010) – Brian Taylor
Doctors (2012) – Dennis Hirst

Film 
Another Year (2010) – Mourner
Jane Eyre (2011) – Briggs
A Little Chaos (2014) – Jean
Miss Peregrine's Home for Peculiar Children (2016) – 40's First Old Man
Daniel (2019) – William

References

External links 

People from Bangor, Gwynedd
Welsh male television actors
1950 births
2021 deaths